Shemini, Sh'mini, or Shmini ( — Hebrew for "eighth," the third word, and the first distinctive word, in the parashah) is the 26th weekly Torah portion (parashah) in the annual Jewish cycle of Torah reading and the third in the Book of Leviticus. Parashah Shemini tells of the consecration of the Tabernacle, the deaths of Nadab and Abihu, and the dietary laws of kashrut. The parashah constitutes  It is made up of 4,670 Hebrew letters, 1,238 Hebrew words, 91 verses, and 157 lines in a Torah Scroll (Sefer Torah).

Jews read it the 25th or 26th Sabbath after Simchat Torah, in late March or April. In years when the first day of Passover falls on a Sabbath (as it did in 2018 and 2019), Jews in Israel and Reform Jews read the parashah following Passover one week before Conservative and Orthodox Jews in the Diaspora, for Jews in Israel and Reform Jews celebrate Passover for seven days and thus read the next parashah (in 2018, Shemini) on the Sabbath one week after the first day of Passover, while Conservative and Orthodox Jews in the Diaspora celebrate Passover for eight days and read the next parashah (in 2018, Shemini) one week later. In some such years (for example, 2018), the two calendars realign when Conservative and Orthodox Jews in the Diaspora read Behar together with Bechukotai while Jews in Israel and Reform Jews read them separately.

Readings

First reading — Leviticus 9:1–16
In the first reading (aliyah), on the eighth day of the ceremony to ordain the priests and consecrate the Tabernacle, Moses instructed Aaron to assemble calves, rams, a goat, a lamb, an ox, and a meal offering as sacrifices (korbanot) to God, saying: "Today the Lord will appear to you." They brought the sacrifices to the front of the Tent of Meeting, and the Israelites assembled there. Aaron began offering the sacrifices as Moses had commanded.

Second reading — Leviticus 9:17–23
In the second reading (aliyah), Aaron concluded offering the sacrifices as Moses had commanded. Aaron lifted his hands toward the people and blessed them. Moses and Aaron then went inside the Tent of Meeting, and when they came out, they blessed the people again. Then the Presence of the Lord appeared to all the people.

Third reading — Leviticus 9:24–10:11
In the third reading (aliyah), fire came forth and consumed the sacrifices on the altar, and the people shouted and fell on their faces. Acting on their own, Aaron's sons Nadab and Abihu each took his fire pan, laid incense on it, and offered alien fire (eish zarah), which God had not commanded. And God sent fire to consume them, and they died. Moses told Aaron, "This is what the Lord meant when He said: ‘Through those near to Me I show Myself holy, and gain glory before all the people,'" and Aaron remained silent. Moses called Aaron's cousins Mishael and Elzaphan to carry away Nadab's and Abihu's bodies to a place outside the camp. Moses instructed Aaron and his sons Eleazar and Ithamar not to mourn Nadab and Abihu by rending their garments or leaving their hair unshorn and not to go outside the Tent of Meeting. And God told Aaron that he and his sons must not drink wine or other intoxicants when they entered the Tent of Meeting, so as to distinguish between the sacred and the profane.

Fourth reading — Leviticus 10:12–15
In the fourth reading (aliyah), Moses directed Aaron, Eleazar, and Ithamar to eat the remaining meal offering beside the altar, designating it most holy and the priests' due. And Moses told them that their families could eat the breast of the elevation offering and the thigh of the gift offering in any clean place.

Fifth reading — Leviticus 10:16–20
In the fifth reading (aliyah), Moses inquired about the goat of sin offering, and was angry with Eleazar and Ithamar when he learned that it had already been burned and not eaten in the sacred area. Aaron answered Moses: "See, this day they brought their sin offering and their burnt offering before the Lord, and such things have befallen me! Had I eaten sin offering today, would the Lord have approved?" And when Moses heard this, he approved.

Sixth reading — Leviticus 11:1–32
In the sixth reading (aliyah), God then instructed Moses and Aaron in the dietary laws of kashrut.

Seventh reading — Leviticus 11:33–47

In the seventh reading (aliyah), God instructed Moses and Aaron in several laws of purity, saying: "You shall be holy, for I am holy." 

In verse 42 the letter  (Vav) in the expression  is enlarged.

Readings according to the triennial cycle
Jews who read the Torah according to the triennial cycle of Torah reading read the parashah according to the following schedule:

In inner-Biblical interpretation
The parashah has parallels or is discussed in these Biblical sources:

Leviticus chapter 9
This is the pattern of instruction and construction of the Tabernacle and its furnishings:

Professor Gordon Wenham, formerly of Queen's University Belfast and Cheltenham College, noted that the phrase "as the Lord commanded Moses" or a similar phrase "recurs with remarkable frequency" in  appearing in  5, 9, 13, 17,  21, 29, 34, 36;  7, 10, 21;  13, and 15.

In  the Presence of the Lord appeared to the people and fire came forth and consumed the sacrifices on the altar. God also showed approval by sending fire in  upon the birth of Samson, in 2 Chronicles  upon the dedication of Solomon's Temple, and in 1 Kings  at Elijah's contest with the prophets of Baal.

Leviticus chapter 10
 reports that Nadab and Abihu put fire and incense (ketoret) in their censors and offered "strange fire" (eish zarah).  prohibited offering "strange incense" (ketoret zarah).

 reports that Aaron's sons Nadab and Abihu died prematurely, after Aaron had in  fashioned for the Israelites the Golden Calf and they said, "This is your god, O Israel, who brought you up out of the land of Egypt." Professor James Kugel of Bar Ilan University noted that Abihu and Abijah are essentially the same names, as Abijah is a variant pronunciation of Abihu.

Leviticus chapter 11

And perhaps similarly,  associates it with childbirth and  associates it with skin disease.  associates it with various sexuality-related events.

In early nonrabbinic interpretation
The parashah has parallels or is discussed in these early nonrabbinic sources:

Leviticus chapter 10
Philo interpreted  to teach that because Nadab and Abihu fearlessly and fervently proceeded rapidly to the altar, an imperishable light dissolved them into ethereal beams like a whole burnt-offering and took them up to heaven. Thus, Nadab and Abihu died in order that they might live, exchanging their mortal lives for immortal existence, departing from the creation to the creator God. Philo interpreted the words of  "they died before the Lord," to celebrate their incorruptibility and demonstrate that they lived, for no dead person could come into the sight of the Lord.

Josephus taught that Nadab and Abihu did not bring the sacrifices that Moses told them bring, but rather brought those that they used to offer before, and consequently they were burned to death.

Leviticus chapter 11
Aristeas cited as a reason for dietary laws that they distinctly set Jews apart from other people.

Professor Isaiah Gafni of Hebrew University of Jerusalem noted that in the Book of Tobit, the protagonist Tobit observed the dietary laws.

In classical rabbinic interpretation
The parashah is discussed in these rabbinic sources from the era of the Mishnah and the Talmud:

Leviticus chapter 9
Rabbi Judah taught that the words of  "And it came to pass on the eighth day," begin the second major topic of the book of Leviticus.

A Midrash taught that the account that begins with  “And it came to pass on the eighth day,” should have appeared at the beginning of the Book of Leviticus (as it relates the Inauguration of the Tabernacle service), but that it appears where it does illustrates the proposition that the Torah does not follow a chronological order.

Thus, the first words of  "And it came to pass (va-yehi) on the eighth day," presage that Nadab and Abihu died on that day.

But a Baraita compared the day that the Israelites dedicated the Tabernacle with the day that God created the universe. Reading the words of  "And it came to pass on the eighth day," a Baraita taught that on that day (when the Israelites dedicated the Tabernacle) there was joy before God as on the day when God created heaven and earth. For  says, "And it came to pass (va-yehi) on the eighth day," and  says, "And there was (va-yehi) one day."

The Midrash reports that this occurred on the eighth day of the consecration of the Tabernacle, as reported in  And as  reports, "when all the people saw, they shouted, and fell on their faces."

Rabbi Samuel bar Nahman taught that Moses first incurred his fate to die in the wilderness from his conduct at the Burning Bush, for there God tried for seven days to persuade Moses to go on his errand to Egypt, as  says, “And Moses said to the Lord: ‘Oh Lord, I am not a man of words, neither yesterday, nor the day before, nor since you have spoken to your servant’” (which the Midrash interpreted to indicate seven days of conversation). And in the end, Moses told God in  “Send, I pray, by the hand of him whom You will send.” God replied that God would keep this in store for Moses. Rabbi Berekiah in Rabbi Levi's name and Rabbi Helbo give different answers on when God repaid Moses. One said that all the seven days of the consecration of the priesthood in  Moses functioned as High Priest, and he came to think that the office belonged to him. But in the end, God told Moses that the job was not his, but his brother's, as  says, “And it came to pass on the eighth day, that Moses called Aaron.” The other taught that all the first seven days of Adar of the fortieth year, Moses beseeched God to enter the Promised Land, but in the end, God told him in  “You shall not go over this Jordan.”

A Baraita taught that in the Inauguration of the Tabernacle, Aaron removed himself for seven days and then officiated for one day. Throughout the seven days, Moses transmitted to Aaron the Torah's guidelines to train Aaron in the service. Following this example, in subsequent generations, the High Priest removed himself for seven days before Yom Kippur to officiate for one day. And two scholars of the disciples of Moses (thus excluding the Sadducees) transmitted the Torah's guidelines to the High Priest throughout the seven days to train him in the service.

Rabbi Jacob bar Acha taught in the name of Rabbi Zorah that the command to Aaron in  "at the door of the tent of meeting shall you abide day and night seven days, and keep the charge of the Lord," served as a source for the law of seven days of mourning for the death of a relative (shivah). Rabbi Jacob bar Acha interpreted Moses to tell Aaron that just as God observed seven days of mourning for the then-upcoming destruction of the world at the time of the Flood of Noah, so too Aaron would observe seven days of mourning for the upcoming death of his sons Nadab and Abihu. The Gemara asked whether one mourns before a death, as Jacob bar Acha appears to argue happened in these two cases. In reply, the Gemara distinguished between the mourning of God and people: People, who do not know what will happen until it happens, do not mourn until the deceased dies. But God, who knows what will happen in the future, mourned for the world before its destruction. The Gemara noted, however, that there are those who say that the seven days before the Flood were days of mourning for Methuselah (who died just before the Flood).

Similarly, reading in  that "it came to pass on the eighth day," a Midrash recounted how Moses told Aaron in  "you shall not go out from the door of the tent of meeting seven days." The Midrash interpreted this to mean that Moses thereby told Aaron and his sons to observe the laws of mourning for seven days, before those laws would affect them. Moses told them in  that they were to "keep the charge of the Lord," for so God had kept seven days of mourning before God brought the Flood, as  reports, "And it came to pass after the seven days, that the waters of the Flood were upon the earth." The Midrash deduced that God was mourning by noting that  reports, "And it repented the Lord that He had made man on the earth, and it grieved Him (vayitatzeiv) at His heart." And 2 Samuel  uses the same word to express mourning when it says, "The king grieves (ne'etzav) for his son." After God told Moses in  "And there I will meet with the children of Israel; and [the Tabernacle] shall be sanctified by My glory," Moses administered the service for seven days in fear, fearing that God would strike him down. And it was for that reason that Moses told Aaron to observe the laws of mourning. When Aaron asked Moses why, Moses replied (in the words of ) "so I am commanded." Then, as reported in  God struck Nadab and Abihu instead. And thus in  Moses told Aaron that he finally understood, "This is what the Lord meant when He said: ‘Through those near to Me I show Myself holy, and gain glory before all the people.'"

Rabban Simeon bar Yochai taught that we learn in  among many places in Scripture, that God showed respect to the elders. For  reports that at the Tent of Meeting, “Moses called Aaron and his sons, and the elders of Israel.” And in Messianic times it will also be so, as  says: “For the Lord of Hosts will reign in Mount Zion, and in Jerusalem, and before His elders shall be glory.”

Rav Assi of Hozna'ah deduced from the words, "And it came to pass in the first month of the second year, on the first day of the month," in  that the Tabernacle was erected on the first of Nisan. With reference to this, a Tanna taught that the first of Nisan took ten crowns of distinction by virtue of the ten momentous events that occurred on that day. The first of Nisan was: (1) the first day of the Creation, (2) the first day of the princes' offerings, (3) the first day for the priesthood to make the sacrificial offerings, (4) the first day for public sacrifice, (5) the first day for the descent of fire from Heaven, (6) the first for the priests' eating of sacred food in the sacred area, (7) the first for the dwelling of the Shechinah in Israel, (8) the first for the Priestly Blessing of Israel, (9) the first for the prohibition of the high places, and (10) the first of the months of the year.

The Gemara contrasted the language of  “And he said to Aaron: ‘Take you a bull-calf for a sin-offering,’” from the language of  “And to the children of Israel you shall speak, saying: ‘Take a he-goat for a sin-offering.’” The Gemara concluded from this difference that the words “take you” mean from your own resources.

Rabbi Abahu thus distinguished Aaron's offering from his own resources in the Inauguration of the Tabernacle from the High Priest's communal offerings for Shavuot and Rosh Hashanah, and concluded that one cannot reason by analogy from the requirements for the Inauguration to those of Shavuot or Rosh Hashanah. Similarly, Rabbi Abba distinguished the bull and single ram that  required Aaron to bring for the Inauguration of the Tabernacle from the bull and two rams that  required the High Priest to bring on Shavuot, and thus the Gemara concluded that one cannot reason by analogy from the requirements for the Inauguration to those of Shavuot.

A Midrash taught that  required Aaron to bring

Rabbi Tanhum taught in the name of Rabbi Judan that the words "for today the Lord appears to you" in  indicated that God's presence, the Shekhinah, did not come to abide in the Tabernacle all the seven days of consecration when Moses ministered in the office of High Priest, but the Shekhinah appeared when Aaron put on the High Priest's robes.

Reading the words of  "And [take] an ox and a ram for peace-offerings . . . for today the Lord will appear to you," Rabbi Levi taught that God reasoned that if God would thus reveal God's Self to and bless a priest who sacrificed an ox and a ram for God's sake, how much more should God reveal God's Self to Abraham, who circumcised himself for God's sake. Consequently,  reports, "And the Lord appeared to him [Abraham]."

Reading  “And an ox and a ram for peace offerings . . . for today the Lord appears to you,” Rabbi Levi taught that God reasoned that if God would appear to and blessed a priest who offered a ram in God's name, how much more should God appear to and bless Jacob, whose features are engraved on God's throne. Thus  says, “And God appeared to Jacob again, when he came from Paddan-aram, and blessed him.”

The Rabbis taught in a Baraita that because  says with regard to a meal offering of first-fruits, “you shall . . . lay frankincense thereon; it is a meal-offering,”  meant to include within the requirement for frankincense the meal-offering that  required Aaron to offer on the eighth day of consecration.

A Tanna recited before Rabbi Isaac bar Abba the words of  “And he presented the burnt offering; and offered it according to the ordinance,” which refer to the obligatory burnt offering that  required Aaron to bring on the eighth day of his consecration. The Tanna reasoned that by saying “according to the ordinance,”  referred to the rules that  applied to voluntary burnt offerings, and thus taught that those rules also applied to obligatory burnt offerings. The Tanna concluded that as  required laying on of hands for voluntary burnt offerings, the law also required laying on of hands for obligatory burnt offerings.

Reading  “And Aaron lifted up his hands toward the people, and blessed them,” the Sifra taught that Aaron gave the Priestly Blessing of 

Reading  "And Moses and Aaron went into the tent of meeting," the Sifra asked why Moses and Aaron went into the Tabernacle together. The Sifra taught that they did so that Moses might teach Aaron the right of offering the incense.

Rabbi Judah taught that the same fire that descended from heaven settled on the earth, and did not again return to its former place in heaven, but it entered the Tabernacle. That fire came forth and devoured all the offerings that the Israelites brought in the wilderness, as  does not say, "And there descended fire from heaven," but "And there came forth fire from before the Lord." This was the same fire that came forth and consumed the sons of Aaron, as  says, "And there came forth fire from before the Lord." And that same fire came forth and consumed the company of Korah, as  says, "And fire came forth from the Lord." And the Pirke De-Rabbi Eliezer taught that no person departs from this world until some of that fire, which rested among humanity, passes over that person, as  says, "And the fire rested."

Leviticus chapter 10

A Midrash noted that Scripture records the death of Nadab and Abihu in numerous places. This teaches that God grieved for Nadab and Abihu, for they were dear to God. And thus  quotes God to say: "Through them who are near to Me I will be sanctified."

A Midrash taught that the strange fire was neither from the continual offering of the evening nor from the continual offering of the morning, but was ordinary secular fire. Similarly, Rabbi Akiva taught that the fire they brought was the kind used in a double stove, and read  to report that they "offered unholy fire before the Lord."

The Gemara presented alternative views of how the fire devoured Nadab and Abihu in  According to one view, their bodies were not burned because  says, "they died before the Lord," teaching that it was like normal death (from within, without an outward effect on their body). And according to the other view, they were actually burned. The fire commenced from within, as in normal death (and then consumed their bodies).

Abba Jose ben Dosetai taught that Nadab and Abihu died in  when two streams of fire came forth from the Holy of Holies and divided into four streams, of which two flowed into the nose of one and two into the nose of the other, so that their breath was burned up, but their garments remained untouched (as implied in ).

Bar Kappara said in the name of Rabbi Jeremiah ben Eleazar that Nadab and Abihu died (as reported in ) because of four things: (1) for drawing too near to the holy place, (2) for offering a sacrifice that they had not been commanded to offer, (3) for the strange fire that they brought in from the kitchen, and (4) for not having taken counsel from each other, as  says "Each of them his censer," implying that each acted on his own initiative.

Similarly, reading the words of  "the death of the two sons of Aaron, when they drew near before the Lord, and died," Rabbi Jose deduced that Aaron's sons died because they drew near to enter the Holy of Holies.

Rabbi Mani of She'ab (in Galilee), Rabbi Joshua of Siknin (also in Galilee), and Rabbi Johanan all said in the name of Rabbi Levi that Nadab and Abihu died because of four things, in connection with each of which Scripture mentions death: (1) Because they had drunk wine, for in connection with drinking wine  mentions death, saying, "Drink no wine nor strong drink . . . so that you do not die." (2) Because they lacked the prescribed number of garments (while officiating), for in connection with appropriate garments  mentions death, saying, "And they [the garments] shall be upon Aaron, and upon his sons . . . so that they bear no iniquity and die." Nadab and Abihu lacked their robes (implied perhaps by the report of  that they their bodies were carried out in their tunics), in connection with which  mentions death, saying, "And it shall be upon Aaron to minister . . . so that he does not die." (3) Because they entered the Sanctuary without washing their hands and feet, for  says, "So they shall wash their hands and their feet, so that they do not die," and  says, "When they go into the tent of meeting, they shall wash with water, so that they do not die." (4) Because they had no children, for in connection with not having children  mentions death, saying, "And Nadab and Abihu died . . . and they had no children." Abba Hanin taught that it was because they had no wives, for  says, "And [the High Priest shall] make atonement for himself, and for his house," and "his house" implies that he had to have a wife.

Similarly, Rabbi Levi taught that Nadab and Abihu died because they were arrogant. Many women remained unmarried waiting for them. Nadab and Abihu thought that because their father's brother (Moses) was king, their mother's brother (Nachshon ben Aminadav) was a prince, their father (Aaron) was High Priest, and they were both Deputy High Priests, that no woman was worthy of them. Thus Rabbi Menahma taught in the name of Rabbi Joshua ben Nehemiah that Psalm  applied to Nadab and Abihu when it says, "Fire devoured their young men," because (as the verse continues), "their virgins had no marriage-song."

Rabbi Eliezer (or some say Rabbi Eliezer ben Jacob) taught that Nadab and Abihu died only because they gave a legal decision in the presence of their Master Moses. Even though  reports that "fire came forth from before the Lord and consumed the burnt-offering and the fat on the altar," Nadab and Abihu deduced from the command of  that "the sons of Aaron the priest shall put fire upon the altar" that the priests still had a religious duty to bring some ordinary fire to the altar, as well.

According to the Sifra, some say that Nadab and Abihu died because earlier, when at Sinai they were walking behind Moses and Aaron, they remarked to each other how in a little while, the two old men would die, and they would head the congregation. And God said that we would see who would bury whom.

A Midrash taught that when Nadab, Abihu, and the 70 elders ate and drank in God's Presence in  they sealed their death warrant. The Midrash asked why in  God directed Moses to gather 70 elders of Israel, when  reported that there already were 70 elders of Israel. The Midrash deduced that when in  the people murmured, speaking evil, and God sent fire to devour part of the camp, all those earlier 70 elders had been burned up. The Midrash continued that the earlier 70 elders were consumed like Nadab and Abihu, because they too acted frivolously when (as reported in ) they beheld God and inappropriately ate and drank. The Midrash taught that Nadab, Abihu, and the 70 elders deserved to die then, but because God so loved giving the Torah, God did not wish to create disturb that time.

A Midrash taught that the death of Nadab and Abihu demonstrated the teaching of Rabbi Joshua ben Levi that prayer effects half atonement. At first (after the incident of the Golden Calf), God pronounced a decree against Aaron, as  says, "The Lord was very angry with Aaron to have destroyed (le-hashmid) him." When Moses prayed on Aaron's behalf, God annulled half the decree; two sons died, and two remained. Thus  says, "And the Lord spoke to Moses, saying: ‘Take Aaron and his sons'" (implying that they were to be saved from death).

The Gemara interpreted the report in  that the Tabernacle "shall be sanctified by My glory" to refer to the death of Nadab and Abihu. The Gemara taught that one should read not "My glory" (bi-khevodi) but "My honored ones" (bi-khevuday). The Gemara thus taught that God told Moses in  that God would sanctify the Tabernacle through the death of Nadab and Abihu, but Moses did not comprehend God's meaning until Nadab and Abihu died in  When Aaron's sons died, Moses told Aaron in  that Aaron's sons died only so that God's glory might be sanctified through them. When Aaron thus perceived that his sons were God's honored ones, Aaron was silent, as  reports, "And Aaron held his peace," and Aaron was rewarded for his silence.

Similarly, a Midrash interpreted  where Moses told Aaron, "This is what the Lord meant when He said: ‘Through those near to Me I show Myself holy, and gain glory before all the people.'" The Midrash taught that God told this to Moses in the wilderness of Sinai, when in  God said, "there I will meet with the children of Israel; and the Tabernacle shall be sanctified by My glory." And after the death of Nadab and Abihu, Moses said to Aaron, "At the time that God told me, I thought that either you or I would be stricken, but now I know that they [Nadab and Abihu] are greater than you or me."

Similarly, the Sifra taught that Moses sought to comfort Aaron, telling him that at Sinai, God told him that God would sanctify God's house through a great man. Moses had supposed that it would be either through Aaron or himself that the house would be sanctified. But Moses said that it turned out that Aaron's sons were greater and Moses and Aaron, for through them had the house been sanctified.

Rabbi Akiva taught that because Aaron's cousins Mishael and Elzaphan attended to the remains of Nadab and Abihu (as reported in ), they became the "certain men" who  reported "were unclean by the dead body of a man, so that they could not keep the Passover." But Rabbi Isaac replied that Mishael and Elzaphan could have cleansed themselves before the Passover.

(Family tree from )

The Tosefta found in the account of  that Mishael and Elzaphan "carried them in their tunics out of the camp" that even when God is angry at the righteous, God is mindful of their honor. And the Tosefta concluded that if when God is angry at the righteous, their treatment is such, then when God is disposed to be merciful, how much more so will God be mindful of their honor.

Our Rabbis taught in a Baraita that when Rabbi Ishmael's sons died, Rabbi Tarfon consoled him by noting that, as  reports, upon the death of Nadab and Abihu, Moses ordered that "the whole house of Israel bewail the burning that the Lord has kindled." Rabbi Tarfon noted that Nadab and Abihu had performed only one good deed, as  reports, "And the sons of Aaron presented the blood to him" (during the inaugural service of the Tabernacle). Rabbi Tarfon argued that if the Israelites universally mourned Nadab and Abihu, how much more was mourning due to Rabbi Ishmael's sons (who performed many good deeds).

Rabbi Simeon taught that Nadab and Abihu died only because they entered the Tent of Meeting drunk with wine. Rabbi Phinehas in the name of Rabbi Levi compared this conclusion to the case of a king who had a faithful attendant. When the king found the attendant standing at tavern entrances, the king beheaded the attendant and appointed another in his place. The king did not say why he killed the first attendant, except that he told the second attendant not to enter the doorway of taverns, and thus the king indicated that he put the first attendant to death for such a reason.

Rabbi Rabbi Johanan said in the name of Rabbi Bana'ah that the Torah was transmitted in separate scrolls, as  says, "Then said I, 'Lo I am come, in the roll of the book it is written of me.'" Rabbi Simeon ben Lakish (Resh Lakish), however, said that the Torah was transmitted in its entirety, as  "Take this book of the law." The Gemara reported that Rabbi Johanan interpreted  "Take this book of the law," to refer to the time after the Torah had been joined together from its several parts. And the Gemara suggested that Resh Lakish interpreted  "in a roll of the book written of me," to indicate that the whole Torah is called a "roll," as  says, "And he said to me, 'What do you see?' And I answered, 'I see a flying roll.'" Or perhaps, the Gemara suggested, it is called "roll" for the reason given by Rabbi Levi, who said that God gave eight sections of the Torah, which Moses then wrote on separate rolls, on the day on which the Tabernacle was set up.

And the Gemara cited a Baraita that taught that if a priest ate preserved figs from Keilah, or drank honey or milk (and thereby became disoriented), and then entered the Sanctuary (to perform the service), he was culpable.

And the Gemara explained that the Sages ruled that Kohanim did not recite the Priestly Blessing at Minchah and Ne'ilah prayer services out of concern that some of the Kohanim might be drunk at that time of day (and  prohibited Kohanim from participating in services when intoxicated). But the Kohanim did say the Priestly Blessing at Minchah and Ne'ilah services on Yom Kippur and other fast days, because the Kohanim would not drink on those days. Rabbi Isaac noted that  speaks of separating the Levites "to minister to [God] and to bless in [God's] name" (and thus likens sacrificial service to blessing). From this, Rabbi Isaac deduced that as  did not prohibit an officiating priest from eating the shells of grapes, a priest about to recite the Priestly Blessing could also eat the shells of grapes.

A Baraita taught that both priests who were drunk with wine and those who let their hair grow long were liable to death. For  says, "Drink no wine nor strong drink, you nor your sons with you, that you not die." And  juxtaposes the prohibition of long hair with that of drunkenness. Thus, the Baraita concluded that just as a priest's drunkenness during service was punishable by death, so was his growing long hair. Thus, a Baraita taught that a common priest had to get his hair cut every 30 days, the High Priest every week on the eve of the Sabbath, and the king every day.

A Baraita taught that the righteous are blessed, for not only do they acquire merit, but they bestow merit on their children and children's children to the end of all generations.

A Baraita reported that Rabbi taught that in conferring an honor, we start with the most important person, while in conferring a curse, we start with the least important.  demonstrates that in conferring an honor, we start with the most important person, for when Moses instructed Aaron, Eleazar, and Ithamar that they should not conduct themselves as mourners, Moses spoke first to Aaron and only thereafter to Aaron's sons Eleazar and Ithamar. And  demonstrates that in conferring a curse, we start with the least important, for God cursed the serpent first, and only thereafter cursed Eve and then Adam.

The Mishnah deduced from  that the sacrificial portions, breast, and thigh of an individual's peace-offering required waving but not bringing near the Altar. A Baraita explained how the priests performed the waiving. A priest placed the sacrificial portions on the palm of his hand, the breast and thigh on top of the sacrificial portions, and whenever there was a bread offering, the bread on top of the breast and thigh. And the Gemara noted that  implies that the breast and thigh were on top of the offerings of fat. But the Gemara noted that  says that the priest "shall bring the fat upon the breast." Abaye reconciled the verses by explaining that  refers to the way that the priest brought the parts from the slaughtering place. The priest then turned them over and placed them into the hands of a second priest, who waived them. Noting further that  says that "they put the fat upon the breasts," the Gemara deduced that this second priest then handed the parts over to a third priest, who burned them. The Gemara thus concluded that these verses taught that three priests were required for this part of the service, giving effect to the teaching of  "In the multitude of people is the king's glory."

The Gemara taught that the early scholars were called soferim (related to the original sense of its root safar, "to count") because they used to count all the letters of the Torah (to ensure the correctness of the text). They used to say the vav in gachon,  ("belly"), in  marks the half-way point of the letters in the Torah. (And in a Torah Scroll, scribes write that vav larger than the surrounding letters.) They used to say the words darosh darash,  ("diligently inquired"), in  mark the half-way point of the words in the Torah. And they used to say  marks the half-way point of the verses in the Torah. Rav Joseph asked whether the vav in gachon,  ("belly"), in  belonged to the first half or the second half of the Torah. (Rav Joseph presumed that the Torah contains an even number of letters.) The scholars replied that they could bring a Torah Scroll and count, for Rabbah bar bar Hanah said on a similar occasion that they did not stir from where they were until a Torah Scroll was brought and they counted. Rav Joseph replied that they (in Rabbah bar bar Hanah's time) were thoroughly versed in the proper defective and full spellings of words (that could be spelled in variant ways), but they (in Rav Joseph's time) were not. Similarly, Rav Joseph asked whether  belongs to the first half or the second half of verses. Abaye replied that for verses, at least, we can bring a Scroll and count them. But Rav Joseph replied that even with verses, they could no longer be certain. For when Rav Aha bar Adda came (from the Land of Israel to Babylon), he said that in the West (in the Land of Israel), they divided  into three verses. Nonetheless, the Rabbis taught in a Baraita that there are 5,888 verses in the Torah.

The Mishnah deduced from  that those in the first stage of mourning (onen), prior to the burial of their dead, are prohibited from eating the meat of sacrifices. Similarly, the Mishnah derived from  that a High Priest could offer sacrifices before he buried his dead, but he could not eat sacrificial meat. An ordinary priest in the early stages of mourning, however, could neither offer sacrifices nor eat sacrificial meat. Rava recounted a Baraita that taught that the rule of  regarding one with skin disease, "the hair of his head shall be loose," also applied to a High Priest. The status of a High Priest throughout the year corresponded with that of any other person on a festival (with regard to mourning). For the Mishnah said the High Priest could bring sacrifices on the altar even before he had buried his dead, but he could not eat sacrificial meat. From this restriction of a High Priest, the Gemara inferred that the High Priest would deport himself as a person with skin disease during a festival. And the Gemara continued to teach that a mourner is forbidden to cut his hair, because since  ordained for the sons of Aaron: "Let not the hair of your heads go loose" (after the death of their brothers Nadab and Abihu), we infer that cutting hair is forbidden for everybody else (during mourning), as well.

A Midrash taught that when in  "Moses diligently inquired [literally: inquiring, he inquired] for the goat of the sin-offering," the language indicates that Moses made two inquiries: (1) If the priests had slaughtered the goat of the sin-offering, why had they not eaten it? And (2) If the priests were not going to eat it, why did they slaughter it? And immediately thereafter,  reports that Moses "was angry with Eleazar and with Ithamar," and Midrash taught that through becoming angry, he forgot the law. Rav Huna taught that this was one of three instances where Moses lost his temper and as a consequence forgot a law. Aaron asked Moses whether he should eat consecrated food on the day that his sons died. Aaron argued that since the tithe (which is of lesser sanctity) is forbidden to be eaten by a bereaved person prior to the burial of his dead, how much more certainly must the meat of the sin-offering (which is more sacred) be prohibited to a bereaved person prior to the burial of his dead. Immediately after Moses heard Aaron's argument, he issued a proclamation to the Israelites, saying that he had made an error in regard to the law and Aaron his brother came and taught him. Eleazar and Ithamar had known the law, but kept their silence out of deference to Moses, and as a reward, God addressed them directly along with Moses and Aaron in  When  reports that "the Lord spoke to Moses and to Aaron, saying to them," Rabbi Hiyya taught that the words "to them" referred to Eleazar and Ithamar.

Similarly, Rabbi Nehemiah deduced from  that Aaron's sin-offering was burned (and not eaten by the priests) because Aaron and his remaining sons (the priests) were in the early stages of mourning, and thus disqualified from eating sacrifices.

A scholar who was studying with Rabbi Samuel bar Nachmani said in Rabbi Joshua ben Levi's name that the words, "and, behold, it was burnt," in  taught that where a priest mistakenly brought the blood of an outer sin-offering into the Sanctuary within, the priests had to burn the remainder of the offering. Similarly, Rabbi Jose the Galilean deduced from the words, "Behold, the blood of it was not brought into the Sanctuary within," in  that if a priest took the sacrifice outside prescribed bounds or took its blood within the Sanctuary, the priests were required to burn the rest of the sacrifice.

Samuel taught that the interpretation that Aaron should not have eaten the offering agreed with Rabbi Nehemiah while the other interpretation that Aaron should have eaten the offering agreed with Rabbi Judah and Rabbi Simeon. Rabbi Nehemiah argued that they burned the offering because the priests were in the first stages of mourning. Rabbi Judah and Rabbi Simeon maintained that they burned it because the offering had become defiled during the day, not because of bereavement. Rabbi Judah and Rabbi Simeon argued that if it was because of bereavement, they should have burned all three sin offerings brought that day. Alternatively, Rabbi Judah and Rabbi Simeon argued that the priest would have been fit to eat the sacrifices after sunset. Alternatively, Rabbi Judah and Rabbi Simeon argued that Phinehas was then alive and not restricted by the law of mourning.

According to Rabbi Nehemiah, this is how the exchange went: Moses asked Aaron why he had not eaten the sacrifice. Moses asked Aaron whether perhaps the blood of the sacrifice had entered the innermost sanctuary, but Aaron answered that its blood had not entered into the inner sanctuary. Moses asked Aaron whether perhaps the blood had passed outside the sanctuary courtyard, but Aaron replied that it had not. Moses asked Aaron whether perhaps the priests had offered it in bereavement, and thus disqualified the offering, but Aaron replied that his sons had not offered it, Aaron had. Thereupon Moses exclaimed that Aaron should certainly have eaten it, as Moses had commanded in  that they should eat it in their bereavement. For if  instructs that the tithe, which is of lesser holiness, cannot be eaten in mourning, how much more should that prohibition apply to sacrifices like the sin-offering that are more holy. When Moses heard that argument, he replied with  that it was pleasing to him, and he admitted his error. Moses did not seek to excuse himself by saying that he had not heard the law from God, but admitted that he had heard it and forgot it.

According to Rabbi Judah and Rabbi Simeon, this is how the exchange went: Moses asked Aaron why he had not eaten, suggesting the possibilities that the blood had entered the innermost sanctuary or passed outside the courtyard or been defiled by being offered by his sons, and Aaron said that it had not. Moses then asked whether perhaps Aaron had been negligent through his grief and allowed the sacrifice to become defiled, but Aaron exclaimed with  that these events and even more could have befallen him, but Aaron would not show such disrespect to sacrifices. Thereupon Moses exclaimed that Aaron should certainly have eaten it, as Moses had commanded in  Aaron argued from analogy to the tithe (as in Rabbi Nehemiah's version), and Moses accepted Aaron's argument. But Moses argued that the priests should have kept the sacrificial meat and eaten it in the evening. And to that Aaron replied that the meat had accidentally become defiled after the sacrifice.

Leviticus chapter 11

Reading  a Midrash taught that in 18 verses, Scripture places Moses and Aaron (the instruments of Israel's deliverance) on an equal footing (reporting that God spoke to both of them alike), and thus there are 18 benedictions in the Amidah.

Rav Hisda explained that Noah led them past the Ark, and those that the Ark accepted (in multiples of seven) were certainly clean, and those that the Ark rejected were certainly unclean. Rabbi Abbahu cited  "And they that went in, went in male and female," to show that they went in of their own accord (in their respective pairs, seven of the clean and two of the unclean).

Rabbi Tanhum ben Hanilai compared the laws of kashrut to the case of a physician who went to visit two patients, one whom the physician judged would live, and the other whom the physician judged would die. To the one who would live, the physician gave orders about what to eat and what not to eat. On the other hand, the physician told the one who would die to eat whatever the patient wanted. Thus to the nations who were not destined for life in the World To Come, God said in  "Every moving thing that lives shall be food for you." But to Israel, whom God intended for life in the World To Come, God said in  "These are the living things which you may eat."

Rav reasoned that since  teaches that "Every word of God is pure," then the precepts of kashrut were given for the express purpose of purifying humanity.

Reading  "My ordinances (mishpatai) shall you do, and My statutes (chukotai) shall you keep," the Sifra distinguished "ordinances" (mishpatim) from "statutes" (chukim). The term "ordinances" (mishpatim), taught the Sifra, refers to rules that even had they not been written in the Torah, it would have been entirely logical to write them, like laws pertaining to theft, sexual immorality, idolatry, blasphemy and murder. In regard to these, taught the Sifra, the Torah says simply that God legislated them and we have no right to raise doubts about them.

For in  God says, "I have separated you from the nations to be mine." So one should separate from transgression and accept the rule of Heaven.

Rabbi Berekiah said in the name of Rabbi Isaac that in the Time to Come, God will make a banquet for God's righteous servants, and whoever had not eaten meat from an animal that died other than through ritual slaughtering (neveilah, prohibited by ) in this world will have the privilege of enjoying it in the World To Come. (By one's present self-restraint one might merit to partake of the banquet in the Hereafter.) For this reason Moses admonished the Israelites in  "This is the animal that you shall eat."

A Midrash interpreted  "The Lord lets loose the prisoners," to read, "The Lord permits the forbidden," and thus to teach that what God forbade in one case, God permitted in another. God forbade the abdominal fat of cattle (in ), but permitted it in the case of beasts. God forbade consuming the sciatic nerve in animals (in ) but permitted it in fowl. God forbade eating meat without ritual slaughter (in ) but permitted it for fish. Similarly, Rabbi Abba and Rabbi Jonathan in the name of Rabbi Levi taught that God permitted more things than God forbade.

Reading  "These are the living things that you may eat," the Sifra taught that the use of the word "these" indicates that Moses would hold up an animal and show the Israelites, and say to them, "This you may eat," and "This you may not eat."

The Mishnah noted that the Torah does not similarly state the characteristics of birds, but the sages taught that every bird that seizes its prey is unclean. Every bird that has an extra toe (a hallux), a crop, and a gizzard that can be peeled off is clean. Rabbi Eliezer the son of Rabbi Zadok taught that every bird that parts its toes (evenly) is unclean. The Mishnah taught that among locusts, all that have four legs, four wings, jointed legs (as in ), and wings covering the greater part of the body are clean. Rabbi Jose taught that it must also bear the name "locust." The Mishnah taught that among fish, all that have fins and scales are clean. Rabbi Judah said that it must have (at least) two scales and one fin (to be clean). The scales are those (thin discs) that are attached to the fish, and the fins are those (wings) by which it swims.

Reading  “Whatever . . . chews the cud, among the beasts, that may you eat,” the Tosefta taught that whatever chews the cud has no upper teeth.

The Mishnah taught that hunters of wild animals, birds, and fish, who chanced upon animals that  defined as unclean were allowed to sell them. Rabbi Judah taught that a person who chanced upon such animals by accident was allowed to buy or sell them, provided that the person did not make a regular trade of it. But the sages did not allow it.

Rav Shaman bar Abba said in the name of Rav Idi bar Idi bar Gershom who said it in the name of Levi bar Perata who said it in the name of Rabbi Nahum who said it in the name of Rabbi Biraim who said it in the name of a certain old man named Rabbi Jacob that those of the Nasi's house taught that (cooking) a forbidden egg among 60 (permitted) eggs renders them all forbidden, (but cooking) a forbidden egg among 61 (permitted) eggs renders them all permitted. Rabbi Zera questioned the ruling, but the Gemara cited the definitive ruling: It was stated that Rabbi Helbo said in the name of Rav Huna that with regard to a (forbidden) egg (cooked with permitted ones), if there are 60 besides the (forbidden) one, they are (all) forbidden, but if there are 61 besides the (forbidden) one, they are permitted.

The Mishnah taught the general rule that wherever the flavor from a prohibited food yields benefit, it is prohibited, but wherever the flavor from a prohibited food does not yield benefit, it is permitted. For example, if (prohibited) vinegar fell into split beans (it is permitted).

Reading  "the swine, because it parts the hoof, and is cloven-footed, but does not chew the cud, is unclean to you," a Midrash compared the pig to the Roman Empire. Just as the swine when reclining puts out its hooves as if to say, "See that I am clean," so too the Roman Empire boasted (of its virtues) as it committed violence and robbery under the guise of establishing justice. The Midrash compared the Roman Empire to a governor who put to death the thieves, adulterers, and sorcerers, and then leaned over to a counselor and said: "I myself did these three things in one night."

The Gemara reported the Sages’ teaching that bees’ honey is permitted, because bees bring the nectar from the flowers into their body, but they do not excrete it from their body. The Gemara answered that Rav Sheshet taught (in accordance with the opinion of Rabbi Jacob) that God permits honey as an exception to the principle that a substance that emerges from a non-kosher animal is non-kosher. For in a Baraita, Rabbi Jacob read the words of  "Yet these may you eat of all winged creatures," and reasoned that the word "these" indicates that you may eat these, but you may not eat a non-kosher winged creature. The Gemara asked why this inference was necessary, as  provides the prohibition against eating a non-kosher winged creature explicitly, saying, "All winged creatures that go upon all fours are a repugnance to you." Rather, the Gemara taught, one should understand the inference to mean that one may not eat a non-kosher winged creature, but one may eat that which a non-kosher winged creature discharges from its body — namely the honey of bees.

Reading  the Mishnah compared human blood to the blood of domestic animals in one respect, and to the blood of reptiles in another respect. The Mishnah noted that human blood is like the blood of animals in that it renders seeds susceptible to impurity (by virtue of ) and like the blood of reptiles in that one would not be liable to extirpation (karet) on account of consuming it. ( forbids consuming the blood of animals, but not the blood of reptiles.)

The Gemara noted the paradox that mother’s milk is kosher even though it is a product of the mother’s blood, which is not kosher. In explanation, the Gemara quoted  “Who can bring a pure thing out of an impure? Is it not the One?” For God can bring a pure thing, such as milk, out of an impure thing, such as blood.

On the day when Rabbi Eleazar ben Azariah displaced Rabban Gamaliel II as Principal of the School, Rabbi Akiva expounded on the words of  "and every earthen vessel, into which any of them falls, whatsoever is in it shall be unclean." Rabbi Akiva noted that  does not state "is unclean" but "will make others unclean." Rabbi Akiva deduced from this that a loaf that is unclean in the second degree (when, for example, the vessel becomes unclean first and then defiles the loaf in it), can make whatever it comes in contact with unclean in the third degree. Rabbi Joshua asked who would remove the dust from the eyes of Rabban Johanan ben Zakai (so that he might hear this wonderful proof), as Rabban Johanan ben Zakai said that another generation would pronounce clean a loaf that was unclean in the third degree on the ground that there is no text in the Torah according to which it would be unclean. Rabbi Joshua noted that Rabbi Akiva, the intellectual descendant of Rabban Johanan ben Zakai (as Rabbi Akiva was the pupil of Rabbi Eliezer ben Hurcanus, a disciple of Rabban Johanan ben Zakai), adduced a text in the Torah —  — according to which such a loaf was unclean.

The Mishnah taught that the wife of one who scrupulously observes tithes and purity laws (a chaver) may lend a sieve and a sifter to the wife of one who is lax observing tithes and purity laws (an am ha-aretz), and may sort, grind and sift with her. But once she wets the flour and thereby renders it subject to uncleanness under  she may not touch it, as one may not assist transgressors. The Mishnah taught that this teaching was said only for the sake of peace.

The Gemara reported that the Sages read the words of  "Sanctify yourselves and you will be sanctified," to teach that people who sanctify themselves a little are sanctified and assisted greatly. If people sanctify themselves below, then they are sanctified above. If people sanctify themselves in this world, then they will be sanctified in the World To Come.

Rav Naḥman bar Isaac reported a Baraita: Rav Judah said that Rav said (or some say that it was taught in a Baraita) that the words of  allude to steps one takes at a meal. "Sanctify yourselves” alludes to the first waters with which one washes one’s hands before a meal; "you shall be holy" alludes to the final waters with which one washes one’s hands after a meal and before reciting the Grace after Meals (Birkat Hamazon); "for I am holy" alludes to the oil that one spreads on one’s hands; and "I am the Lord your God" alludes to the Grace after Meals.

The Gemara considered whether the words of  "Sanctify yourselves therefore, and be sacred," which apply to avoiding the foods prohibited in  could also teach that with regard to every act that the Torah prohibits, there is in addition a positive commandment of sanctity to avoid that act. The Gemara objected that if this were so, then every single prohibition in the entire Torah would contain both a positive commandment and a prohibition, and thus rejected this reasoning.

In medieval Jewish interpretation
The parashah is discussed in these medieval Jewish sources:

Leviticus chapter 9
The Zohar taught that  directed Aaron to “take for yourself a bull calf for a sin offering” as an ordinance meant personally for Aaron to atone for the sin of the Golden Calf that he brought upon Israel. The Zohar observed that Aaron had to purge himself, for but for him the Golden Calf would not have emerged.

Reading the words of Moses in  "today the Lord will appear to you," Ibn Ezra taught that Moses referred to the fire that came forth from God.

Leviticus chapter 10
Baḥya ibn Paquda taught that because God shows special goodness to certain people, by which they have been singled out, for instance, to be a prophet, a leader of a nation, or a sage whose spirit God has awakened and endowed with wisdom, understanding, counsel, and similar qualities, such people are under an obligation of additional service of God. Baḥya taught that God will continue these gifts for those who perform that service in full measure, and will increase their power over these gifts and understanding of them, and reward those people in the world hereafter. But whoever among such people rebels against God, despite the beneficence that God has specially bestowed upon them, will fall from all these degrees, and God will hold them more strictly to account, as  says, "This is it that the Lord spoke, saying, 'I will be sanctified in them that come near Me, and before all the people I will be glorified.'"

Leviticus chapter 11
Judah Halevi expressed admiration for those who first divided the Torah's text into verses, equipped it with vowel signs, accents, and masoretic signs, and counted the letters so carefully that they found that the gimel in gachon,  ("belly"), in  stands at the exact middle of the Torah. (Note, however, the Gemara's report, discussed in "classical rabbinic interpretation" above, that some said that the vav in gachon, marks the half-way point of the Torah.)

In modern interpretation
The parashah is discussed in these modern sources:

Leviticus chapter 10
Professor James Kugel of Bar Ilan University reported that according to one theory, the Priestly source (often abbreviated P) invented Nadab and Abihu, giving them the names of the discredited King Jeroboam's sons, so that they could die in the newly inaugurated sanctuary (as noted in ) and thereby defile it through corpse contamination, so that God could then instruct Aaron in  about how to purify the sanctuary through Yom Kippur. This theory posited that the Israelites had originally used Yom Kippur's purification procedure any time it was needed during the year, and thus it made sense to the narrative to have the sanctuary contaminated (in ) and then immediately purged (in ), but eventually, when the Israelites made sanctuary purgation an annual rite, the Priestly source inserted  to list other potential sources of impurity that might require the sanctuary to be purged.

Leviticus chapter 11
Those things that cohere with the comprehensiveness of the created cosmology are deemed good.

Kugel reported that the Israeli archaeologist Israel Finkelstein found no pig bones in hilltop sites starting in the Iron I period (roughly 1200–1000 BCE) and continuing through Iron II, while before that, in Bronze Age sites, pig bones abounded. Kugel deduced from Finkelstein's data that the new hilltop residents were fundamentally different from both their predecessors in the highlands and the city Canaanites — either because they were a different ethnic group, or because they had adopted a different way of life, for ideological or other reasons. Kugel inferred from Finkelstein's findings that these highlanders shared some ideology (if only a food taboo), like modern-day Jews and Muslims. Kugel concluded that the discontinuities between their way of life and that of the Canaanite city dwellers and earlier highland settlers supported the idea that the settlers were not exurbanites.

Noting that  limits the mammals that qualify for the Jewish table to those that chew the cud and show split hoofs, Milgrom observed that these requirements effectively prohibit people from eating the flesh of the entire animal kingdom, except for three domestic plant-eaters — cattle, sheep, and goats. Milgrom argued that the Bible’s system of dietary laws was thus meant to tame the killer instinct in humans through a system of restrictions allowing humans to satiate their lust for animal flesh but not become dehumanized in the process. Milgrom posited that the basic rules are these: (1) The law severely limited the choice of animal food. (2) Only those who can qualify by their skill and piety can kill the animals — skill in employing a slaughtering technique that renders death painless, and piety in being aware of the Divine sanction that has permitted such slaughter. (3) The few permitted animals, when ritually slaughtered, are still not allowed for consumption until their blood is drained.

Balentine argued that God’s admonition in  "sanctify yourselves and be holy; for I am holy," explained "why Israel must not defile itself by eating forbidden animals," for as God distinguished between animal species in creation, human "distinguishing between clean and unclean animals is an act of faith that mirrors God’s work in establishing and sustaining the ‘very good’ design of creation."

Professor Mary Douglas, formerly of University College London, Northwestern University, and Princeton University, suggested that animals that   prohibits represent the vulnerable — blind worms, vulnerable scaleless fish, and ceaselessly laboring ants — which parallel human beggars, orphans, and widows. Douglas argued that  directs people not to prey on them, as "Holiness is incompatible with predatory behavior." Similarly, Balentine argued that Leviticus stipulates that "only the animals that reflect the normal characteristics of their kind are edible," while those that do not possess these characteristics "are disadvantaged, because they lack the means for survival that are common to their species."

Similarly, in the late 1990s, the Central Conference of American Rabbis of Reform Judaism ruled that it is a good thing for a Jew who observes kashrut to participate in a medical experiment involving a pork byproduct.

Commandments
According to Sefer ha-Chinuch, there are 6 positive and 11 negative commandments in the parashah:
A Kohen must not enter the Temple with long hair.
A Kohen must not enter the Temple with torn clothes.
A Kohen must not leave the Temple during service.
A Kohen must not enter the Temple intoxicated.
To examine the signs of animals to distinguish between kosher and non-kosher.
Not to eat non-kosher animals
To examine the signs of fish to distinguish between kosher and non-kosher
Not to eat non-kosher fish
Not to eat non-kosher fowl
To examine the signs of locusts to distinguish between kosher and non-kosher
To observe the laws of impurity caused by the eight insects
To observe the laws of impurity concerning liquid and solid foods
To observe the laws of impurity caused by a dead beast
Not to eat non-kosher creatures that crawl on land
Not to eat worms found in fruit
Not to eat creatures that live in water other than fish
Not to eat non-kosher maggots

Haftarah

In general
The haftarah for the parashah is:
for Ashkenazi Jews: 
for Sephardi Jews:

Summary
David gathered together all the chosen men of Israel — 30,000 in all — and went to retrieve the Ark of the Covenant from Baale-judah. They brought the Ark out of the house of Abinadab and set it on a new cart. Abinadab's sons Uzzah and Ahio drove the cart, with Ahio going before the Ark. David and the Israelites played with all manner of instruments — harps, psalteries, timbrels, sistra, and cymbals. When they came to the threshing-floor of Nacon, the oxen stumbled, and Uzzah put out his hand to the Ark. In anger, God smote Uzzah for his error, and Uzzah died by the Ark.

Displeased and afraid, David questioned how the Ark could come to him. So David took the Ark to the house of Obed-Edom the Gittite and left it there for three months, during which time God blessed Obed-Edom and his house.

When David heard that God had blessed Obed-Edom because of the Ark, David brought the Ark to Jerusalem with joy. When those who bore the Ark had gone six paces, they sacrificed an ox and a fatling. The Israelites brought up the Ark with shouting and the sound of the horn, and David danced with all his might girded with a linen ephod. As the Ark came into the city, Michal the daughter of Saul looked out the window and saw David leaping and dancing, and she despised him in her heart.

They set the Ark in a tent that David pitched for it, David offered burnt-offerings and peace-offerings, and David blessed the people in the name of the Lord. David distributed a sweet cake of bread to all the people of Israel, and the people departed to their houses. (The Haftarah ends at this point for Sephardi Jews, but continues for Ashkenazi Jews.)

When David returned to bless his household, Michal came out to meet him with scorn, taunting him for uncovering himself before his servants' handmaids. David retorted to Michal that he danced before the God who had chosen him over her father, and that he would be viler than that. Michal never had children thereafter.

God gave David rest from his enemies, and David asked Nathan the prophet why David should dwell in a house of cedar, while the Ark dwelt within curtains. At first Nathan told David to do what was in his heart, but that same night God directed Nathan to tell David not to build God a house, for God had not dwelt in a house since the day that God had brought the children of Israel out of Egypt, but had abided in a tent and in a tabernacle. God directed Nathan to tell David that God took David from following sheep to be a prince over Israel, God had been with David wherever he went, and God would make David a great name. God would provide a place for the Israelites at rest from their enemies, God would make David into a dynasty, and when David died, God would see that David's son would build a house for God's name. God would be to David's son a father, and he would be to God a son; if he strayed, God would chasten him, but God's mercy would not depart from him. David's kingdom would be established forever. And Nathan told David everything in his vision.

Connection to the parashah
Both the parashah and the haftarah report efforts to consecrate the holy space followed by tragic incidents connected with inappropriate proximity to the holy space. In the parashah, Moses consecrated the Tabernacle, the home of the Ark of the Covenant, while in the haftarah, David set out to bring the Ark to Jerusalem. Then in the parashah, God killed Nadab and Abihu "when they drew near" to the Ark, while in the haftarah, God killed Uzzah when he "put forth his hand to the Ark."

On Shabbat Parah
When the parashah coincides with Shabbat Parah (the special Sabbath prior to Passover), the haftarah is:
for Ashkenazi Jews: 
for Sephardi Jews: 
On Shabbat Parah, the Sabbath of the red heifer, Jews read  which describes the rites of purification using the red heifer (parah adumah). Similarly, the haftarah in Ezekiel 36 also describes purification. In both the special reading and the haftarah in Ezekiel 36, sprinkled water cleansed the Israelites.

On Shabbat Machar Chodesh
When the parashah coincides with Shabbat Machar Chodesh (as it did in 2015), the haftarah is

Notes

Further reading
The parashah has parallels or is discussed in these sources:

Biblical
 (Nadab and Abihu).
 (Nadab and Abihu);  (Nadab and Abihu).
 (kashrut).
 (snail);  (pelican).

Early nonrabbinic
Letter of Aristeas. 139–52. Alexandria, 3rd–1st Centruty BCE. In The Old Testament Pseudepigrapha: Volume 2: Expansions of the "Old Testament" and Legends, Wisdom and Philosophical Literature, Prayers, Psalms, and Odes, Fragments of Lost Judeo-Hellenistic works. Edited by James H. Charlesworth, pages 7, 22–23. New York: Anchor Bible, 1985. .
Philo. Allegorical Interpretation, book 2: 15:57–58, 26:104–05; book 3: 47:139–48:141, 49:144, 50:147; On Husbandry 30:131–35; On Drunkenness 32:126–27, 35:140–41; On the Migration of Abraham 12:64–69; Who Is the Heir of Divine Things? 49:238–40, 51:249–51; On Flight and Finding 11:59, 28:157; On Dreams, That They Are God-Sent 2:9:67; The Special Laws, book 2: 8:33; book 4: 18:105–06, 20:110, 21:113–22:118, 36:191. Alexandria, early 1st Century C.E. In, e.g., The Works of Philo: Complete and Unabridged, New Updated Edition. Translated by Charles Duke Yonge, pages 44, 49, 66–67, 185, 218–19, 259, 296, 298, 326, 335, 392, 571, 626–27, 635. Peabody, Massachusetts: Hendrickson Publishers, 1993. .
1 Corinthians   Circa 53–57. (abrogating kashrut).
Romans  1st century. (abrogating kashrut).
Mark  Circa 66–70. (abrogating kashrut).
Josephus, Antiquities of the Jews 3:8:6–7; 8:8:4. Circa 93–94. In, e.g., The Works of Josephus: Complete and Unabridged, New Updated Edition. Translated by William Whiston, pages 92, 229. Peabody, Massachusetts: Hendrickson Publishers, 1987. .
Acts  28. 2nd century. (abrogating kashrut).

Classical rabbinic
Mishnah: Sheviit 5:9, 7:4; Bikkurim 2:7, 11; Pesachim 8:8; Sotah 5:2; Avodah Zarah 5:2; Horayot 3:5; Menachot 5:6; Chullin 1:1–12:5. Land of Israel, circa 200 C.E. In, e.g., The Mishnah: A New Translation. Translated by Jacob Neusner, pages 81, 84, 171–72, 246, 455, 670, 695, 743, 765–87. New Haven: Yale University Press, 1988. .
Tosefta: Berakhot 4:17; Demai 2:7; Sotah 5:13; Zevachim 8:25; Shehitat Chullin 1:1–10:16; Parah 1:5. Land of Israel, circa 250 C.E. In, e.g., The Tosefta: Translated from the Hebrew, with a New Introduction. Translated by Jacob Neusner, volume 1, pages 26, 85, 853; volume 2, pages 1347, 1371–1405, 1746. Peabody, Massachusetts: Hendrickson Publishers, 2002. .
Sifra 99:1–121:2:13. Land of Israel, 4th Century C.E. In, e.g., Sifra: An Analytical Translation. Translated by Jacob Neusner, volume 2, pages 121–229. Atlanta: Scholars Press, 1988. .
Jerusalem Talmud: Peah 12b; Kilayim 69a; Sheviit 55b; Terumot 1b, 73a, 88a, 100a, 101a; Maasrot 41a; Orlah 34a; Bikkurim 12b; Shabbat 13a, 78b; Eruvin 10b; Pesachim 13b, 24a, 62b–63b; Yoma 3b; Taanit 20b; Megillah 15a, 29a; Moed Katan 17a; Chagigah 8a, 23a; Nazir 23a, 27b; Sotah 23b, 26a, 36a; Gittin 11a; Bava Kamma 30a; Sanhedrin 46b, 72b. Tiberias, Land of Israel, circa 400 CE. Reprinted in, e.g., Talmud Yerushalmi. Edited by Chaim Malinowitz, Yisroel Simcha Schorr, and Mordechai Marcus, volumes 3, 5, 6b–9, 12–13, 16, 18–19, 21, 25–28, 34–37, 39, 41, 45. Brooklyn: Mesorah Publications, 2006–2018. And in, e.g., The Jerusalem Talmud: A Translation and Commentary. Edited by Jacob Neusner and translated by Jacob Neusner, Tzvee Zahavy, B. Barry Levy, and Edward Goldman. Peabody, Massachusetts: Hendrickson Publishers, 2009. .
Leviticus Rabbah 1:8; 2:10; 10:4; 11:1–14:1; 20:4–5, 8–10; 26:1. Land of Israel, 5th Century. In, e.g., Midrash Rabbah: Leviticus. Translated by Harry Freedman and Maurice Simon, volume 4, pages 12, 29, 125, 135–79, 257–62, 325. London: Soncino Press, 1939. .

Babylonian Talmud: Berakhot 53b, 61a; Shabbat 12a, 27a, 63b–64a, 83b–84a, 87b, 90b, 95b, 107a, 123b, 125a, 136a–b; Eruvin 13b, 28a, 63a, 87b, 104b; Pesachim 14a, 16a, 18a–b, 20b, 23a–b, 24b, 49b, 67b, 82b–83a, 91b; Yoma 2b–4a, 5b, 21b, 39a, 53a, 73b, 76b–77a, 80a–b, 87a; Sukkah 25b; Beitzah 6b, 19a, 20a; Rosh Hashanah 16b; Taanit 15b, 17b, 26b; Megillah 9b, 10b, 18a; Moed Katan 2a, 13a–b, 14b–15b, 19b, 24a, 28b; Chagigah 11a, 19a, 22b, 24a, 26b; Yevamot 20b, 40a, 43a, 54a–b, 74b–75a, 87a, 114a; Ketubot 15a, 50a, 60a; Nazir 4a, 38a, 52a, 64a; Sotah 27b, 29a–b, 38a–b, 47a; Gittin 60a–b, 61b–62a, 68b; Kiddushin 30a, 59b, 80a; Bava Kamma 2a–b, 16a, 25b, 38a, 54a–b, 62b–63a, 64b, 76b–77a, 78a, 81a; Bava Metzia 22a, 61b, 90b; Bava Batra 9b, 66b, 80a, 91a, 97a; Sanhedrin 5b, 17a, 22b, 52a, 70b–71a, 83b, 107b, 108b; Makkot 3b, 11a, 13a, 16b; Shevuot 5a, 7a, 9b–10b, 14b, 18b, 23a, 36b; Avodah Zarah 40a, 47b, 68b; Horayot 4a, 12b; Zevachim 3a–b, 10b, 17b, 25b, 28a, 34a, 55a, 60a, 61b, 69b, 82a–b, 99b, 100b–01b, 105a, 115b; Menachot 23a, 29a, 39b, 59a, 61a, 62a, 70b, 93b, 96b, 101b; Chullin 2a–142a; Bekhorot 6a–7b, 9b, 15b, 16a, 38a, 45b, 51a; Keritot 4b, 13b, 15b, 21a, 22a; Meilah 16a–17b; Tamid 33b; Niddah 18a, 19b, 21a, 42b, 51a–b, 55b, 56a. Babylonia, 6th Century. In, e.g., Talmud Bavli. Edited by Yisroel Simcha Schorr, Chaim Malinowitz, and Mordechai Marcus, 72 volumes. Brooklyn: Mesorah Publications, 2006.

Medieval
Saadia Gaon. The Book of Beliefs and Opinions, 10:15. Baghdad, Babylonia, 933. Translated by Samuel Rosenblatt, page 396. New Haven: Yale University Press, 1948. .
Solomon ibn Gabirol. A Crown for the King, 35:470. Spain, 11th Century. Translated by David R. Slavitt, pages 62–63. New York: Oxford University Press, 1998. .

Rashi. Commentary. Leviticus 9–11. Troyes, France, late 11th Century. In, e.g., Rashi. The Torah: With Rashi's Commentary Translated, Annotated, and Elucidated. Translated and annotated by Yisrael Isser Zvi Herczeg, volume 3, pages 93–134. Brooklyn: Mesorah Publications, 1994. .
Rashbam. Commentary on the Torah. Troyes, early 12th century. In, e.g., Rashbam's Commentary on Leviticus and Numbers: An Annotated Translation. Edited and translated by Martin I. Lockshin, pages 47–68. Providence: Brown Judaic Studies, 2001. .
Judah Halevi. Kuzari. part 3, ¶ 31. Toledo, Spain, 1130–1140. In, e.g., Jehuda Halevi. Kuzari: An Argument for the Faith of Israel. Introduction by Henry Slonimsky, page 165. New York: Schocken, 1964. .
Abraham ibn Ezra. Commentary on the Torah. Mid-12th century. In, e.g., Ibn Ezra's Commentary on the Pentateuch: Leviticus (Va-yikra). Translated and annotated by H. Norman Strickman and Arthur M. Silver, volume 3, pages 56–84. New York: Menorah Publishing Company, 2004. .

Maimonides. Mishneh Torah: Hilchot Tum'at Ochalin (The Laws of the Impurity of Foods), chapter 16, ¶ 12. Egypt, circa 1170–1180. In, e.g., Mishneh Torah: Sefer Taharah: The Book of Purity. Translated by Eliyahu Touger, volume 2, pages 294–95. New York: Moznaim Publishing, 2009. .
Maimonides. Guide for the Perplexed, 1:37; 3:46, 47, 48. Cairo, Egypt, 1190. In, e.g., Moses Maimonides. The Guide for the Perplexed. Translated by Michael Friedländer, pages 53, 364, 367–68, 370. New York: Dover Publications, 1956. .

Hezekiah ben Manoah. Hizkuni. France, circa 1240. In, e.g., Chizkiyahu ben Manoach. Chizkuni: Torah Commentary. Translated and annotated by Eliyahu Munk, volume 3, pages 694–712. Jerusalem: Ktav Publishers, 2013. .
Nachmanides. Commentary on the Torah. Jerusalem, circa 1270. In, e.g., Ramban (Nachmanides): Commentary on the Torah. Translated by Charles B. Chavel, volume 3, pages 102–55. New York: Shilo Publishing House, 1974. .
Zohar 1:54a, 73b, 167b; 2:11b, 26b, 67a, 124b, 193a, 219b; 3:24b, 31b, 33a, 35a–42a, 127a, 190b. Spain, late 13th Century.
Bahya ben Asher. Commentary on the Torah. Spain, early 14th century. In, e.g., Midrash Rabbeinu Bachya: Torah Commentary by Rabbi Bachya ben Asher. Translated and annotated by Eliyahu Munk, volume 5, pages 1572–620. Jerusalem: Lambda Publishers, 2003. .
Jacob ben Asher (Baal Ha-Turim). Commentary on the Torah. Early 14th century. In, e.g., Baal Haturim Chumash: Vayikra/Leviticus. Translated by Eliyahu Touger, edited, elucidated, and annotated by Avie Gold, volume 3, pages 1079–111. Brooklyn: Mesorah Publications, 2000. .
Jacob ben Asher. Perush Al ha-Torah. Early 14th century. In, e.g., Yaakov ben Asher. Tur on the Torah. Translated and annotated by Eliyahu Munk, volume 3, pages 827–51. Jerusalem: Lambda Publishers, 2005. .
Isaac ben Moses Arama. Akedat Yizhak (The Binding of Isaac). Late 15th century. In, e.g., Yitzchak Arama. Akeydat Yitzchak: Commentary of Rabbi Yitzchak Arama on the Torah. Translated and condensed by Eliyahu Munk, volume 2, pages 567–77. New York, Lambda Publishers, 2001. .

Modern
Isaac Abravanel. Commentary on the Torah. Italy, between 1492–1509. In, e.g., Abarbanel: Selected Commentaries on the Torah: Volume 3: Vayikra/Leviticus. Translated and annotated by Israel Lazar, pages 81–105. Brooklyn: CreateSpace, 2015. .
Obadiah ben Jacob Sforno. Commentary on the Torah. Venice, 1567. In, e.g., Sforno: Commentary on the Torah. Translation and explanatory notes by Raphael Pelcovitz, pages 526–37. Brooklyn: Mesorah Publications, 1997. .
Moshe Alshich. Commentary on the Torah. Safed, circa 1593. In, e.g., Moshe Alshich. Midrash of Rabbi Moshe Alshich on the Torah. Translated and annotated by Eliyahu Munk, volume 2, pages 643–59. New York, Lambda Publishers, 2000. .
Avraham Yehoshua Heschel. Commentaries on the Torah. Cracow, Poland, mid 17th century. Compiled as Chanukat HaTorah. Edited by Chanoch Henoch Erzohn. Piotrkow, Poland, 1900. In Avraham Yehoshua Heschel. Chanukas HaTorah: Mystical Insights of Rav Avraham Yehoshua Heschel on Chumash. Translated by Avraham Peretz Friedman, pages 211–18. Southfield, Michigan: Targum Press/Feldheim Publishers, 2004. .
Shabbethai Bass. Sifsei Chachamim. Amsterdam, 1680. In, e.g., Sefer Vayikro: From the Five Books of the Torah: Chumash: Targum Okelos: Rashi: Sifsei Chachamim: Yalkut: Haftaros, translated by Avrohom Y. Davis, pages 140–210. Lakewood Township, New Jersey: Metsudah Publications, 2012.
Chaim ibn Attar. Ohr ha-Chaim. Venice, 1742. In Chayim ben Attar. Or Hachayim: Commentary on the Torah. Translated by Eliyahu Munk, volume 3, pages 1019–56. Brooklyn: Lambda Publishers, 1999. .
Yitzchak Magriso. Me'am Lo'ez. Constantinople, 1753. In Yitzchak Magriso. The Torah Anthology: MeAm Lo'ez. Translated by Aryeh Kaplan, volume 11, pages 187–274. New York: Moznaim Publishing, 1989. .
Nachman of Breslov. Teachings. Bratslav, Ukraine, before 1811. In Rebbe Nachman's Torah: Breslov Insights into the Weekly Torah Reading: Exodus-Leviticus. Compiled by Chaim Kramer, edited by Y. Hall, pages 321–36. Jerusalem: Breslov Research Institute, 2011. .

Word of Wisdom 1833. Codified as Doctrine and Covenants section 89. In, e.g., Stephen E. Robinson and H. Dean Garrett. A Commentary on the Doctrine and Covenants, Volume Three. Section 89. Salt Lake City: Deseret Book, 2004. . (Mormon dietary laws).
Samson Raphael Hirsch. Horeb: A Philosophy of Jewish Laws and Observances. Translated by Isidore Grunfeld, pages 47–50, 211, 314–31, 338, 574, 582–86. London: Soncino Press, 1962. Reprinted 2002 . Originally published as Horeb, Versuche über Jissroel's Pflichten in der Zerstreuung. Germany, 1837.

Samuel David Luzzatto (Shadal). Commentary on the Torah. Padua, 1871. In, e.g., Samuel David Luzzatto. Torah Commentary. Translated and annotated by Eliyahu Munk, volume 3, pages 924–33. New York: Lambda Publishers, 2012. .
Union of American Hebrew Congregations. The Pittsburgh Platform. Pittsburgh, 1885. ("We hold that all such Mosaic and rabbinical laws as regulate diet . . . originated in ages and under the influence of ideas entirely foreign to our present mental and spiritual state. They fail to impress the modern Jew with a spirit of priestly holiness; their observance in our days is apt rather to obstruct than to further modern spiritual elevation.")

Yehudah Aryeh Leib Alter. Sefat Emet. Góra Kalwaria (Ger), Poland, up to 1905. Excerpted in The Language of Truth: The Torah Commentary of Sefat Emet. Translated and interpreted by Arthur Green, pages 159–65. Philadelphia: Jewish Publication Society, 1998. . Reprinted 2012. .
Louis Ginzberg. Legends of the Jews, volume 3, pages 179–92.  Philadelphia: Jewish Publication Society, 1911.
Abraham Isaac Kook. The Moral Principles. Early 20th Century. In Abraham Isaac Kook: the Lights of Penitence, the Moral Principles, Lights of Holiness, Essays, Letters, and Poems. Translated by Ben Zion Bokser, page 140. Mahwah, New Jersey: Paulist Press 1978. .

G. Deutsch. "Kosher Kitchen in Military Camps." In Yearbook of the Central Conference of American Rabbis, Vol. 28, pages 124–127. Central Conference of American Rabbis, 1918.
Hermann Cohen. Religion of Reason: Out of the Sources of Judaism. Translated with an introduction by Simon Kaplan; introductory essays by Leo Strauss, pages 103, 110, 205. New York: Ungar, 1972. Reprinted Atlanta: Scholars Press, 1995. . Originally published as Religion der Vernunft aus den Quellen des Judentums. Leipzig: Gustav Fock, 1919.
Alexander Alan Steinbach. Sabbath Queen: Fifty-four Bible Talks to the Young Based on Each Portion of the Pentateuch, pages 81–84. New York: Behrman's Jewish Book House, 1936.

Thomas Mann. Joseph and His Brothers. Translated by John E. Woods, pages 256–57, 348. New York: Alfred A. Knopf, 2005. . Originally published as Joseph und seine Brüder. Stockholm: Bermann-Fischer Verlag, 1943.
Ernest Wiesenberg. "Related Prohibitions: Swine Breeding and the Study of Greek." Hebrew Union College Annual, volume 27 (1956): pages 213–33.
Mary Douglas. "The Abominations of Leviticus." In Purity and Danger: An Analysis of the Concepts of Pollution and Taboo, pages 41–57. New York: Routledge, 1966. .
Joe Green. The Jewish Vegetarian Tradition. South Africa: 1969.
Seymour E. Freedman. The Book of Kashruth: A Treasury of Kosher Facts and Frauds. Bloch Publishing Company, 1970. .
Noah J. Cohen. Tsa'ar Ba'ale Hayim — The Prevention of Cruelty to Animals, Its Bases, Development, and Legislation in Hebrew Literature. New York: Feldheim, 1976.
J.C.H. Laughlin. "The ‘Strange Fire' of Nadab and Abihu." Journal of Biblical Literature, volume 95 (1976): pages 559–65.

Aaron Lichtenstein. “Holocaust Homily and Response.” Hebrew Studies, volume 19 (1978): page 82.
Gordon J. Wenham. The Book of Leviticus, pages 145–85. Grand Rapids, Michigan: William B. Eerdmans Publishing Company, 1979. .
Samuel H. Dresner, Seymour Siegel, and David M. Pollock. The Jewish Dietary Laws. United Synagogue, New York, 1980. .
Alfred Cohen. "Vegetarianism from a Jewish Perspective." Journal of Halacha and Contemporary Society, volume 1 (number 2) (fall 1981).
Louis A. Berman. Vegetarianism and the Jewish Tradition. New York: Ktav, 1982. .
Elijah J. Schochet. Animal Life in Jewish Tradition: Attitudes and Relationships. New York : Ktav, 1984.
Victor (Avigdor) Hurowitz. “The Priestly Account of Building the Tabernacle.” Journal of the American Oriental Society, volume 105 (number 1) (January–March 1985): pages 21–30.
J. David Bleich. "Vegetarianism and Judaism." Tradition, volume 23 (number 1) (Summer, 1987).
Pinchas H. Peli. Torah Today: A Renewed Encounter with Scripture, pages 115–19. Washington, D.C.: B'nai B'rith Books, 1987. .
Baruch A. Levine. The JPS Torah Commentary: Leviticus: The Traditional Hebrew Text with the New JPS Translation, pages 55–72, 243–48. Philadelphia: Jewish Publication Society, 1989. .
Jacob Milgrom. "Ethics and Ritual: The Foundations of the Biblical Dietary Laws." In Religion and Law: Biblical, Jewish, and Islamic Perspectives, pages 159–91. Edited by E.B. Firmage. Winona Lake, Indiana: Eisenbrauns, 1989. .
Yochanan Zweig. “The Dedication of the Tabernacle.” Tradition: A Journal of Orthodox Jewish Thought, volume 25 (number 1) (fall 1989): pages 11–16.
Harvey J. Fields. A Torah Commentary for Our Times: Volume II: Exodus and Leviticus, pages 111–19. New York: UAHC Press, 1991. .
Roberta Kalechofsky. Judaism and Animal Rights: Classical and Contemporary Responses. Marblehead, Massachusetts: Micah Publications, 1992. .
Jacob Milgrom. "Food and Faith: The Ethical Foundations of the Biblical Diet Laws: The Bible has worked out a system of restrictions whereby humans may satiate their lust for animal flesh and not be dehumanized. These laws teach reverence for life." Bible Review, volume 8 (number 6) (December 1992).
Mary Douglas. "The Forbidden Animals in Leviticus." Journal for the Study of the Old Testament, volume 18 (number 59) (1993): pages 3–23.
Victor Avigdor Hurowitz. “Review Essay: Ancient Israelite Cult in History, Tradition, and Interpretation.” AJS Review, volume 19 (number 2) (1994): pages 213–36.
Walter C. Kaiser Jr., " The Book of Leviticus," in The New Interpreter's Bible, volume 1, pages 1063–83. Nashville: Abingdon Press, 1994. .
Judith S. Antonelli. "Food and Sanctification." In In the Image of God: A Feminist Commentary on the Torah, pages 257–63. Northvale, New Jersey: Jason Aronson, 1995. .
Roberta Kalechofsky. A Boy, A Chicken, and The Lion of Judea — How Ari Became a Vegetarian. Marblehead, Massachusetts: Micah Publications, 1995. .
Rabbis and Vegetarianism: An Evolving Tradition. Edited by Roberta Kalechofsky. Marblehead, Massachusetts: Micah Publications, 1995. .
Ellen Frankel. The Five Books of Miriam: A Woman's Commentary on the Torah, pages 159–62. New York: G. P. Putnam's Sons, 1996. .
Erhard S. Gerstenberger. Leviticus: A Commentary, pages 96–146. Louisville, Kentucky: Westminster John Knox Press, 1996. .

W. Gunther Plaut. The Haftarah Commentary, pages 254–67. New York: UAHC Press, 1996. .
Sorel Goldberg Loeb and Barbara Binder Kadden. Teaching Torah: A Treasury of Insights and Activities, pages 177–82. Denver: A.R.E. Publishing, 1997. .
Roberta Kalechofsky. Vegetarian Judaism: A Guide for Everyone. Marblehead, Massachusetts: Micah Publications, 1998. .
Jacob Milgrom. Leviticus 1–16, volume 3, pages 569–742. New York: Anchor Bible, 1998. .
Mary Douglas. "Land Animals, Pure and Impure" and "Other Living Beings." In Leviticus as Literature, pages 134–75. Oxford: Oxford University Press, 1999. .
Susan Freeman. Teaching Jewish Virtues: Sacred Sources and Arts Activities, pages 149–64. Springfield, New Jersey: A.R.E. Publishing, 1999. ..
Frank H. Gorman Jr. "Leviticus." In The HarperCollins Bible Commentary. Edited by James L. Mays, pages 154–56. New York: HarperCollins Publishers, revised edition, 2000. .
Ilene Schneider. "Kashrut, Food, and Women." In The Women's Torah Commentary: New Insights from Women Rabbis on the 54 Weekly Torah Portions. Edited by Elyse Goldstein, pages 196–201. Woodstock, Vermont: Jewish Lights Publishing, 2000. .
Richard H. Schwartz. Judaism and Vegetarianism. New York: Lantern, 2001. .
Samuel E. Balentine. Leviticus: Interpretation: A Bible Commentary for Teaching and Preaching, pages 69–70, 80–100. Louisville: John Knox Press, 2002.
Lainie Blum Cogan and Judy Weiss. Teaching Haftarah: Background, Insights, and Strategies, pages 81–90. Denver: A.R.E. Publishing, 2002. .
Michael Fishbane. The JPS Bible Commentary: Haftarot, pages 161–68. Philadelphia: Jewish Publication Society, 2002. .

Pinchus Presworsky. Birds of the Torah. Brooklyn: Silver Graphics, 2002. .
Elie Wiesel. "Nadab and Abihu: A Story of Fire and Silence." In Wise Men and Their Tales: Portraits of Biblical, Talmudic, and Hasidic Masters, pages 68–81. New York: Schocken, 2003. .
Robert Alter. The Five Books of Moses: A Translation with Commentary, pages 576–88. New York: W.W. Norton & Co., 2004. .
Aaron Gross, Richard H. Schwartz, Roberta Kalechofsky, and Jay Levine. A Case for Jewish Vegetarianism. Norfolk, Virginia: People for the Ethical Treatment of Animals, 2004.
Jacob Milgrom. Leviticus: A Book of Ritual and Ethics: A Continental Commentary, pages 88–121. Minneapolis: Fortress Press, 2004. .
Baruch J. Schwartz. "Leviticus." In The Jewish Study Bible. Edited by Adele Berlin and Marc Zvi Brettler, pages 224–32. New York: Oxford University Press, 2004. .
Julie Wolkoff. "Haftarat Shimini: II Samuel 6:1–7:17." In The Women's Haftarah Commentary: New Insights from Women Rabbis on the 54 Weekly Haftarah Portions, the 5 Megillot & Special Shabbatot. Edited by Elyse Goldstein, pages 121–24. Woodstock, Vermont: Jewish Lights Publishing, 2004. .
Antony Cothey. “Ethics and Holiness in the Theology of Leviticus.” Journal for the Study of the Old Testament, volume 30 (number 2) (December 2005): pages 131–51.
Professors on the Parashah: Studies on the Weekly Torah Reading Edited by Leib Moscovitz, pages 168–74. Jerusalem: Urim Publications, 2005. .
Bernard J. Bamberger. "Leviticus." In The Torah: A Modern Commentary: Revised Edition. Edited by W. Gunther Plaut; revised edition edited by David E.S. Stern, pages 705–33. New York: Union for Reform Judaism, 2006. .
Calum Carmichael. Illuminating Leviticus: A Study of Its Laws and Institutions in the Light of Biblical Narratives. Baltimore: Johns Hopkins University Press, 2006. .
Suzanne A. Brody. "A Detailed List." In Dancing in the White Spaces: The Yearly Torah Cycle and More Poems, page 87. Shelbyville, Kentucky: Wasteland Press, 2007. .
David C. Kraemer. Jewish Eating and Identity Through the Ages. New York: Routledge, 2007. .
James L. Kugel. How To Read the Bible: A Guide to Scripture, Then and Now, pages 289–90, 303, 327–28, 541, 660. New York: Free Press, 2007. .
Christophe Nihan. From Priestly Torah to Pentateuch: A Study in the Composition of the Book of Leviticus. Coronet Books, 2007. .
James W. Watts. Ritual and Rhetoric in Leviticus: From Sacrifice to Scripture. New York: Cambridge University Press, 2007. .
Nathan MacDonald. What Did the Ancient Israelites Eat? Diet in Biblical Times. Cambridge: William B. Eerdmans Publishing Company, 2008. .
Naphtali S. Meshel. "Food for Thought: Systems of Categorization in Leviticus 11." Harvard Theological Review, volume 101 (number 2) (April 2008): pages 203–29.
The Torah: A Women's Commentary. Edited by Tamara Cohn Eskenazi and Andrea L. Weiss, pages 615–36. New York: URJ Press, 2008. .
Roy E. Gane. "Leviticus." In Zondervan Illustrated Bible Backgrounds Commentary. Edited by John H. Walton, volume 1, pages 298–301. Grand Rapids, Michigan: Zondervan, 2009. .
Reuven Hammer. Entering Torah: Prefaces to the Weekly Torah Portion, pages 153–57. New York: Gefen Publishing House, 2009. .
Tamar Kamionkowski. "Nadav and Avihu and Dietary Laws: A Case of Action and Reaction: Parashat Shemini (leviticus 9:1–11:47)". InTorah Queeries: Weekly Commentaries on the Hebrew Bible. Edited by Gregg Drinkwater, Joshua Lesser, and David Shneer; foreword by Judith Plaskow, pages 135–39. New York: New York University Press, 2009. .
Union for Reform Judaism. “Eating Jewishly.” New York, 2009. (resolution adopted by the URJ).
Mark Leuchter. “The Politics of Ritual Rhetoric: A Proposed Sociopolitical Context for the Redaction of Leviticus 1–16.” Vetus Testamentum, volume 60 (number 3) (2010): pages 345–65.
Jeffrey Stackert. "Leviticus." In The New Oxford Annotated Bible: New Revised Standard Version with the Apocrypha: An Ecumenical Study Bible. Edited by Michael D. Coogan, Marc Z. Brettler, Carol A. Newsom, and Pheme Perkins, pages 154–58. New York: Oxford University Press, Revised 4th Edition 2010. .
Pinchus Presworsky. Animals of the Torah. Sys Marketing Inc., 2011. .

Jonathan Haidt. The Righteous Mind: Why Good People Are Divided by Politics and Religion, pages 13, 103, 325 note 22, 337 note 16. New York: Pantheon, 2012. . (kashrut).
Shmuel Herzfeld. "Don't Dwell on It." In Fifty-Four Pick Up: Fifteen-Minute Inspirational Torah Lessons, pages 151–55. Jerusalem: Gefen Publishing House, 2012. .
Tracy M. Lemos. “Where There Is Dirt, Is There System? Revisiting Biblical Purity Constructions.” Journal for the Study of the Old Testament, volume 37 (number 3) (March 2013): pages 265–94.

Jonathan Sacks. Covenant & Conversation: A Weekly Reading of the Jewish Bible: Leviticus: The Book of Holiness, pages 133–61. Jerusalem: Maggid Books, 2015. .
Annette Yoshiko Reed. "From Sacrifice to the Slaughterhouse: Ancient and Modern Approaches to Meat, Animals, and Civilization." (2015).
Jonathan Sacks. Lessons in Leadership: A Weekly Reading of the Jewish Bible, pages 135–39. New Milford, Connecticut: Maggid Books, 2015. .
Jonathan Sacks. Essays on Ethics: A Weekly Reading of the Jewish Bible, pages 165–69. New Milford, Connecticut: Maggid Books, 2016. .
James Michaels. “Strange Fire of Substance Abuse.” Washington Jewish Week. (April 19, 2017): page 34.
Kenneth Seeskin. Thinking about the Torah: A Philosopher Reads the Bible, pages 113–33. Philadelphia: The Jewish Publication Society, 2016. .
Shai Held. The Heart of Torah, Volume 2: Essays on the Weekly Torah Portion: Leviticus, Numbers, and Deuteronomy, pages 26–36. Philadelphia: Jewish Publication Society, 2017. .
Steven Levy and Sarah Levy. The JPS Rashi Discussion Torah Commentary, pages 83–85. Philadelphia: Jewish Publication Society, 2017. .
Laura Reiley. “Doctrine and Diet: Shalt Thou Eat an Impossible Burger?” Washington Post. September 12, 2019, pages A1, A18.

External links

Texts
Masoretic text and 1917 JPS translation
Hear the parashah chanted 
Hear the parashah read in Hebrew

Commentaries

Academy for Jewish Religion, California
Academy for Jewish Religion, New York
Aish.com 
Akhlah: The Jewish Children's Learning Network
Aleph Beta Academy
American Jewish University — Ziegler School of Rabbinic Studies
Anshe Emes Synagogue, Los Angeles 
Ari Goldwag
Ascent of Safed
Bar-Ilan University 
Chabad.org
eparsha.com
G-dcast
The Israel Koschitzky Virtual Beit Midrash
Jewish Agency for Israel
Jewish Theological Seminary
Kabbala Online
LearningTorah
Mechon Hadar
MyJewishLearning.com
Ohr Sameach
Orthodox Union
OzTorah, Torah from Australia
Oz Ve Shalom — Netivot Shalom
Pardes from Jerusalem
Professor James L. Kugel
Professor Michael Carasik 
Rabbi Dov Linzer
Rabbi Fabian Werbin
Rabbi Jonathan Sacks
RabbiShimon.com 
Rabbi Shlomo Riskin
Rabbi Shmuel Herzfeld
Rabbi Stan Levin 
Reconstructionist Judaism 
Sephardic Institute 
Shiur.com
613.org Jewish Torah Audio
Tanach Study Center
TheTorah.com
Torah from Dixie 
Torah.org
TorahVort.com
Union for Reform Judaism
United Synagogue of Conservative Judaism
What's Bothering Rashi?
Yeshivat Chovevei Torah
Yeshiva University

Weekly Torah readings in Adar
Weekly Torah readings in Nisan
Weekly Torah readings from Leviticus